Touzao is a town of eastern Jiangsu province, People's Republic of China, lying on the roadside of Jiangsu Provincial Highway 333 (or S333). It is located nearly due east and under the administration of Dongtai City, and has a population of about 50,000, residing in six residential communities and 23 villages.

References

Township-level divisions of Jiangsu
Dongtai